The 2012 Penn State Nittany Lions football team represented the Pennsylvania State University in the 2012 NCAA Division I FBS football season. The team was coached by Bill O'Brien in his first season and played its home games in Beaver Stadium in University Park, Pennsylvania, US. It was a member of the Big Ten Conference and played in the Leaders Division. Penn State was ineligible to play in a bowl game for the 2012 season due to sanctions imposed in wake of the Penn State child sex abuse scandal.

O'Brien was hired as Penn State's 15th head football coach, replacing Hall of Fame coach, Joe Paterno. He was introduced as the head coach at a press conference on January 7, 2012. The team added player names to the back of their jerseys to recognize the players who stayed with the program despite adversity, and also wore a blue ribbon to support child abuse victims.

After losing its first two games, the Nittany Lions finished their season winning eight of their final 10 to finish with a record of eight wins and four losses (8–4). They were not eligible to participate in a bowl game despite their winning record.

Schedule

Coaching staff
 Bill O'Brien – head coach and offensive coordinator
 Jim Bernhardt– special assistant/player development
 John Butler – defensive backs 
 Craig Fitzgerald  – strength and conditioning
 Charlie Fisher – quarterbacks coach
 Stan Hixon – assistant head coach and wide receivers
 Larry Johnson – defensive line
 Charles London – running backs and recruiting coordinator
 Mac McWhorter – offensive line
 Ted Roof – defensive coordinator
 John Strollo – tight ends
 Ron Vanderlinden – linebackers
 Brian Bell – Assistant Strength and Conditioning

Roster
Wide receiver Shawney Kersey left the team on September 12, 2012 for "personal reasons". On September 28, 2012, quarterback and tight end Paul Jones left the Penn State football team.

Game summaries

September 1 vs. Ohio

The Ohio University Bobcats spoiled Head Coach Bill O'Brien's PSU debut defeating the Nittany Lions 24–14. Penn State led 14–3 at the half due to passing touchdowns by QB Matt McGloin to Bill Belton (6 yard) and Matt Lehman (14 yard). Ohio came out of the half-time intermission with 21 unanswered points from passing scores from QB Tyler Tettleton to Landon Smith (43 yard) and Donte Foster (5 yard) and a Tettleton run (1 yard). Penn State committed several costly turnovers including a muffed punt by linebacker Gerald Hodges which set up an Ohio TD and an interception thrown with a minute left by Matt McGloin which essentially put the nail in the coffin. Beau Blankenship led the way for the Bobcats rushing for 109 yards on 31 carries and catching 7 passes for 72 yards. Allen Robinson led the Lions catching 9 passes for 92 yards. Penn State tight end Kyle Carter also caught 6 passes for 72 yards.

September 8 at Virginia

Penn State was without starting running back Bill Belton due to injury, so senior Derek Day got the start. Penn State's opening drive of the game lasted 17 plays and 75 yards and took up about 6 minutes resulting in an 8-yard TD pass from QB Matt McGloin to Kyle Carter. Their first-half offense was thwarted, however, when they could not convert on 2 FG attempts. Drew Jarrett's 46-yard FG put Virginia on the scoreboard with 3:56 remaining in the first half. True freshman Steven Bench took over QB duties for Penn State late in the first half when McGloin left the field after being hit in the elbow on 2 consecutive series.
Virginia's opening drive of the second half resulted in a 1-yard TD pass from QB Michael Rocco to Jeremiah Mathis. Penn State's FG woes continued in the third quarter when Sam Ficken missed a 20-yard FG which would have tied the game. In the fourth quarter, McGloin completed a long pass to Allen Robinson, who made the diving catch but was shaken up after the play. Ficken's PAT attempt was blocked. Penn State's final scoring drive began when Michael Mauti recovered a Virginia fumble deep in UVA territory. On the ensuing drive, Ficken attempted a 32-yard field goal and, for the first time on the day, made it. Rocco's 6-yard pass to Jake McGee and the ensuing PAT gave Virginia a 1-point lead with 1:28 remaining in the contest. Ficken missed a 43-yard field goal as time expired.

September 15 vs. Navy

In the game where new head coach Bill O'Brien celebrated his first victory at Penn State, the Lions overpowered Navy 34–7. Senior quarterback Matt McGloin threw for 231 yards (13–21) and 4 touchdowns including three to sophomore wide receiver Allen Robinson who had 5 catches for 136 yards. For the second consecutive game, Penn State was without starting halfback Bill Belton. Fifth year senior Michael Zordich, who has spent his career at PSU playing fullback carried the ball 11 times for 50 yards. Teammate Curtis Dukes carried 11 times for 47 yards. Navy turned the ball over several times including a fumble which was recovered by Linebacker U Mike Hull and returned for a 74-yard touchdown. Gerald Hodges also recorded an interception.

September 22 vs. Temple

Led by a strong effort by senior quarterback Matt McGloin who ran for two touchdowns and threw for another, the Lions defeated Temple 24–13. With running back Bill Belton out for the third straight game, it was up to McGloin to lead the team around the goal line. He did, with a one-yard rushing touchdown, followed by a two yarder. He also threw a touchdown to sophomore wide receiver Allen Robinson, who recorded 5 catches for 82 yards and a score. Sophomore Zach Zwinak saw the first extensive action of his career at running back; he ran for 94 yards on 18 carries. Fullback Michael Zordich added 15 carries of his own for 75 yards. Kicker Sam Ficken, who had missed 4 field goals and an extra point the previous week, converted on all 3 extra points and a 21-yard field goal. Defensively, the Lions were led by another strong effort from senior linebacker Michael Mauti, who recorded 9 tackles, and defensive tackle Jordan Hill, who added 7 tackles and a sack.

September 29 at Illinois

After getting a quick three and out on Penn State's first series, Illinois muffed the punt and set up Penn State with great field position. Kicker Sam Ficken attempted a field goal, which he made, but a running into the kicker penalty on Illinois, Penn State was set up inside the 5-yard line. Zach Zwinak ran the ball for a 1-yard touchdown. Later in the quarter, Matt McGloin ran for a score. Taylor Zalewski missed a short field goal late in the first quarter. Early in the second quarter, Sam Ficken missed a 47 yarder of his own. In the second quarter, Matt McGloin threw a 21-yard touchdown pass to Matt Lehman, his tenth of the year. As Lehman was falling into the end zone, an Illinois defender hammered Lehman helmet to helmet and was ejected. At the end of the first half, quarterback Nathan Scheelhaase threw an interception to Michael Mauti who returned the ball 99 yards and was stopped at the one-yard line with one second left. Sam Ficken's 18 yard was blocked to end the half. On a trick play, receiver Josh Ferguson threw a 22-yard touchdown to Spencer Harris in the third quarter. Matt McGloin capped a long drive late in the third quarter with a 2-yard touchdown run, his second of the game. Michael Mauti intercepted Nathan Scheelhaase for the second time of the day near the end of the third quarter. Zach Zwinak went over the century mark with his second touchdown run of the day early in the fourth quarter to put Penn State up 35–7.

October 6 vs. Northwestern

In the Lions' first game against a ranked opponent, they defeated Northwestern 39–28 at Beaver Stadium. Penn State won the toss and elected to receive. Their first drive showed promise, but a false start penalty pushed them back and forcing them to punt. Alex Butterworth's punt was downed at the Northwestern 1. The Wildcats were forced into a quick three-and-out. The ensuing drive for the Lions included two fourth down conversions on their way to inside the five-yard line where, rather than risking a third fourth down on the drive, the Nittany Lions settled for a 21-yard field goal try by Sam Ficken. On Penn State's fifth drive of the game, which began at the Northwestern 40, they slowly drove down the field using the no-huddle offense, converting on fourth and short at one point for their third 4th down conversion of the game. The drive was capped by a one-yard touchdown plunge by Zach Zwinak to give Penn State a 10–0 lead. Northwestern's ensuing drive managed to pick up a couple first downs, but ultimately stalled and they were forced to punt for a fifth time. Penn State, however, muffed this punt and Northwestern recovered at the Penn State 17. Three plays later, Northwestern scored its first touchdown of the game on a two-yard run by Venric Mark to make the score 10–7. After another exchange of punts, Penn State drove from its 21-yard line to the Northwestern 34 where the drive stalled and Penn State was forced to 4th and 4. Penn State elected to try to convert its fourth 4th down of the game, but they failed this time. Northwestern took advantage of this to drive down the field, aided by a controversial pass interference call, and scored another touchdown before the half on a Trevor Siemian pass. At the end of the first half, Penn State trailed 14–10.

Northwestern opened the second half on offense and after one first down was forced to punt. Penn State then moved the ball 80 yards in 12 plays and scored a touchdown on an 8-yard pass from Matt McGloin to Allen Robinson to take a 17–14 lead. Northwestern responded in kind with a touchdown scored on a 10-yard run by Kain Colter to put Penn State down again, this time by a score of 21–17. Penn State's next drive also stalled, and the ensuing Penn State punt resulted in a disaster when Northwestern's Venric Mark returned it 75 yards for a touchdown to widen the gap to 28–17. Penn State responded to this score with its own 18 play 82-yard drive that ended on a touchdown pass from McGloin to Robinson on 4th and 4 from the Northwestern 6. A successful two-point rush by Michael Zordich trimmed the deficit to 25–28 with just under 10 minutes to play. Penn State forced a Northwestern three-and-out, but a good Northwestern punt backed up Penn State to its own 15. Penn State drove, in 13 plays, down the field to the Northwestern 4, along the way converting on another 4th down to make it 5 for 6 on 4th downs. On 2nd and Goal, McGloin was stripped of the ball from behind, but managed to fall on it for a loss of one. One 3rd and Goal, McGloin escaped the pass rush and dove into the end zone to give the Lions a 32–28 lead with 2:37 to play. Northwestern had all three timeouts for what ultimately would be its last chance, but ran four plays and turned the ball over on downs. Penn State ran three consecutive handoffs to Michael Zordich, who took the second one all the way to the three and the third into the end zone to make the score 39–28, the final score.

October 20 at Iowa

October 27 vs. Ohio State

November 3 at Purdue

November 10 at Nebraska

November 17 vs. Indiana

Receiver Allen Robinson caught three touchdown passes in the first half. Senior linebackers Michael Mauti and Gerald Hodges each left in the first half due to injury. Hodges subsequently returned and made an interception late in the second quarter where he tipped the ball to himself and made a diving catch. Mauti was expected to miss significant time with a left knee injury. Quarterback Matt McGloin set both a single-season record for most passing yards in school history and broke Zack Mills' record for most career touchdown passes.

November 24 vs. Wisconsin

Awards
Despite the Lions' ineligibility to play in bowl games, several players were named to the All-Conference Team or received other individual awards.

Bill O'Brien – Big Ten Coach of the Year, National Coach of the Year (ESPN, Maxwell Football Club, Bear Bryant Award)
Matt McGloin – Burlsworth Trophy (top player in college football who began his career as a walk-on); Honorable Mention All Big Ten
Zach Zwinak – Honorable Mention All Big Ten
Allen Robinson – First Team All Big Ten, Richter-Howard Receiver of the Year
Kyle Carter – First Team All Big Ten
Matt Stankiewitch – First Team All Big Ten
John Urschel – First Team All Big Ten
Mike Farrell – Honorable Mention All Big Ten
Sean Stanley – Honorable Mention All Big Ten
Deion Barnes – Honorable Mention All Big Ten, Thompson–Randle El Freshman of the Year
Jordan Hill – First Team All Big Ten, Big Ten Sportsmanship Honoree
Michael Mauti – First Team All Big Ten, Butkus-Fitzgerald Linebacker of the Year, First Team All-American (ESPN)
Gerald Hodges – Second Team All Big Ten
Adrian Amos – Honorable Mention All Big Ten
Stephon Morris – Honorable Mention All Big Ten

Post-season
Four players were invited to the 2013 NFL Scouting Combine, held February 20 to 26 at Lucas Oil Stadium in Indianapolis, Indiana: Jordan Hill, Gerald Hodges, Michael Mauti, and Matt Stankiewitch.

All-star games

References

Penn State
Penn State Nittany Lions football seasons
Penn State Nittany Lions football